Teleiopsis sophistica is a moth of the family Gelechiidae. It is found in China (Shanghai).

References

Moths described in 1935
Teleiopsis